The Guinean bichir (Polypterus ansorgii) is a ray-finned fish from rivers and other freshwater habitats in Western Africa, ranging from Guinea-Bissau to Nigeria. On mature specimens, the bottom jaw may protrude very slightly. It is similar to some other bichirs with which it can be confused.

Named in honor of explorer William John Ansorge (1850-1913), who collected type specimen.

References 

Polypteridae
Taxa named by George Albert Boulenger
Fish described in 1910